The Kamunting railway station (Jawi: ستيسين کريتاڤي كامونتيڠ)  is a Malaysian train station located at and named after the town of Kamunting, Perak.

References

Larut, Matang and Selama District
Railway stations in Perak
Railway stations opened in 1890